Xiangjun may refer to:

Xiangjun (title), a noble title used in imperial China 
Xiang Army or Xiangjun, an army raised from Hunan during the Qing dynasty
Hunan Shoking F.C. or Hunan Xiangjun F.C., a Chinese football club

Given name
Li Xiangjun (1624–1654), Chinese courtesan of the Ming dynasty
Zhai Xiangjun (1939–2019), Chinese translator
Ma Xiangjun (born 1964), Chinese archer

See also
Xiang Jun, Chinese footballer